"Check Yo Self" is the third and final single from American rapper Ice Cube's third solo album, The Predator. It was released on July 13, 1993, and features New York City rappers Das EFX. It topped both the Billboard R&B/Hip-Hop and Rap charts while also reaching number 20 on the Hot 100 chart. The song retains two main versions, the original and a remix which utilizes the same beat as Grandmaster Flash's "The Message", titled "Check Yo Self (The Message Remix)". The original mix includes a sample from the intro of the Beastie Boys' track "The New Style", which uses the phrase "check it" throughout the chorus.

While the single version of the song (also titled Radio Remix "The Message") has been censored, the longer, uncensored version of The Message remix is featured on Ice Cube's Bootlegs & B-Sides album and was later released on his Greatest Hits album. The clean version of "Check Yo Self (The Message Remix)" appeared in the soundtrack of the movie Harold & Kumar Escape from Guantanamo Bay. A new recording, based on the original version of the song, featuring Chuck D was featured in the 2010 film Due Date. In January 2010, Snoop Dogg released a cover version of the song. Guitarist Wayne Krantz included an instrumental version of the song (based on the "message remix" version) on his 2012 album Howie 61.

Music video
The music video for "Check Yo Self" uses the remix version. Similar to the video for his previous single "It Was a Good Day", most of the scenes follow and illustrate respective lyrics of the song. The video continues where "It Was a Good Day" left off, with Ice Cube's home being surrounded and invaded by the LAPD before he is handcuffed and taken under arrest, presumably for murder. Ice Cube is then brought to L.A. County jail where he spends the majority of the video experiencing the conflict described in the lyrics, such as disputes between cellmates and breaking up with his girlfriend. Cube also references his role in Boyz n the Hood "Oh boy, I make dough, but don't call me Doughboy, this ain't no fucking motion picture". After six months pass, Ice Cube is able to win over the female deputy watching him. She helps him break out by dressing him up in a uniform. The two make their way outside to a police cruiser and drive off into the night.

Track listing
 "Check Yo' Self" (radio remix "The Message")
 "Check Yo' Self" (remix instrumental)
 "It Was a Good Day" (radio remix edit)
 "It Was a Good Day" (remix instrumental)
 "24 with an L"

Charts

Weekly charts

Year-end charts

Certifications

Samples

Original version:
"I'm Blue" by the Sweet Inspirations
"The New Style" by Beastie Boys

Remix version:
"The Message" by Grandmaster Flash and the Furious Five
"Deeez Nuuuts" by Dr. Dre featuring Snoop Doggy Dogg, Dat Nigga Daz, Nate Dogg and Warren G

See also
R&B number-one hits of 1993 (USA)

References

1993 singles
Ice Cube songs
Songs written by Ice Cube
Song recordings produced by DJ Muggs
Gangsta rap songs
G-funk songs
Priority Records singles
1993 songs